Upritchard Park is a cricket ground in Bangor, Northern Ireland and the home of Bangor Cricket Club. In 2005, the ground hosted three List A matches in the 2005 ICC Trophy. The first of these was between Canada and Scotland, which resulted in a Scottish victory by 7 wickets.  The second saw Denmark play the UAE, with the match ending in a no result, while the third saw Ireland play Denmark, with Ireland winning by 73 runs.

In 2008, the ground hosted a further List A match between Ireland and Bangladesh A, which resulted in an Irish victory by 5 wickets.

References

External links
Upritchard Park, Bangor at CricketArchive

Cricket grounds in Northern Ireland
Sports venues in County Down